Zeuxine vietnamica is a species of terrestrial orchids spreading by means of underground rhizomes. It is endemic to Vietnam.

References

External links

vietnamica
Endemic orchids of Vietnam
Plants described in 1988